Adi Badri (Chandpurgadhi) is a tehsil, or administrative division, located in the Chamoli district of the Indian state of Uttarakhand. The tehsil is located in the Garhwal region of the state and is known for its natural beauty and cultural significance. The tehsil headquarters is also known in revenue records as Helisera and has the beautiful Benital lake nearby.

The name Adi Badri is derived from the Adibadridham group of temples, located approximately 25 kilometers from Karanprayag on the way to Dwarahat in Kumaon. The group consists of 14 remaining temples that were originally believed to number 16. These temples, which were constructed between the 8th and 12th centuries, are dedicated to Lord Vishnu and various other deities including Shri Lakshminarayan, Gaurishankar, Annapurna, Surya, Satyanarayan, Ganesha, Siva, Garuda, Durga, and Janki. The main temple in the group is dedicated to Lord Vishnu, while the subsidiary shrines are dedicated to the other deities. The temples belong to the Panch- Badri(five Badri) temples in the area. Uttarakhand govt has created a Panch Badri circuit and GMVN(Garhwal Mandal Vikas Nigam) has a guest house in the town. 

The tehsil was created in 2014 by the then Chief Minister Harish Rawat. It is situated at an elevation of 1,800 meters above sea level and is the administrative center for 69 nearby villages. The area is predominantly rural, with agriculture and forestry being the main industries. The tehsil is also home to a number of natural and historical landmarks. Apart from the Adi Badri Temple Complex, the hill fort of Chandpurgarh is also nearby. This was the first capital of Panwar Kings of Garhwal, till mid 15th century. Later on, the Kings shifted to Dewalgarh, Srinagar and Tehri successively. 

The tehsil has 5 pattis namely Adi Badri, Kanswa, Dewalkot, Mathar and Silpata and accordingly 5 Patwaris who look after revenue as well as police work. To reach the place, one can take a flight to Jolly Grant airport at Dehradun or take a train to Rishikesh and from there go by road. The upcoming Rishikesh-Karnaprayag line will make it easy for travelers as it would only be 16 KM from the railhead after the railway operations start.

References 

Geography of Chamoli district